CPT Corporation was founded in 1971 by Dean Scheff in Minneapolis, Minnesota, with co-founders James Wienhold and Richard Eichhorn. CPT first designed, manufactured, and marketed the CPT 4200, a dual-cassette-tape machine that controlled a modified IBM Selectric typewriter to support text editing and word processing.

The CPT 4200 was followed in 1976 by the CPT VM (Visual Memory), a partial-page display-screen dual-cassette-tape unit, and shortly thereafter by the CPT 8000, a full-page display dual-diskette desktop microcomputer that drove stand-alone daisy wheel printers.

Subsequent products included (1) variants on the 8000 series; (2) the CPT 6000 series, which had a lower capacity, smaller screen, and was less expensive; (3) the CPT 9000 series, which had a larger capacity and could run IBM personal computer software; (4) the CPT Phoenix series, which had a graphical capabilities; (5) CPT PT, a software-only reduced version that ran on IBM personal computers and clones; and (6) other related products.

The CPT logooriginally three letters chosen to sound well togetherbegan to be taken as an acronym for "cassette powered typewriting," and subsequently for "computer processed text," and numerous other variants. Major competition was IBM, Wang, Lanier, Xerox, and other word processing vendors.

CPT Corporation was fifth in size among Minnesota-based top high-tech companies, after 3M, Honeywell, Control Data, and Medtronic. Corporate revenues grew to approximately a quarter-billion dollars per year in the mid-1980s, then declined with the proliferation of personal computers. CPT ultimately ceased major manufacturing late in the 20th century.

Selected products

Cassette based

The CPT 4200 was a dual-cassette-tape unit with a small built-in keyboard that controlled a modified IBM Selectric typewriter. Keystrokes entered on the typewriter appeared on the paper as they were recorded on the output cassette, which formed a magnetic replica of the characters printed on the page. That output cassette could later be used as an input cassette, where it would be played back to the typewriter along with new keystrokes to accomplish text editing.

The keyboard of the CPT 4200 had action keys for "skip", "read" and "stop", mode keys for "word", "line", "paragraph," and "page." Pressing "read" transferred a word, line, paragraph, or page (depending on which mode key had been selected) from the input tape to both the typewriter and the output tape. Line boundaries (aka printer margins) recorded on the input tape were ignored or retained depending on whether or not the "adjust" key had been selected. Alternatively, pressing "skip" moved past the corresponding amount of text on the input tape without sending it to the typewriter or to the output tape.

The Selectric's keyboard was active for any new typing, which would appear on the paper and transferred to the output tape. Thus a document was edited by reading back those parts of the text to be retained and skipping those parts to be discarded, with new typing added from the Selectric's keyboard. Price: approx. $5000, 1980-era values.

The CPT Communicator was an add-on to the CPT 4200 that allowed data to be transferred from one text-editing machine to another, or between a text-editing machine and a remote computer, via phone lines. Price: not available.

Microprocessor based

CPT 8000 series

The CPT 8000 was the company's first microcomputer product, exhibited in spring of 1976. It was a self-contained desktop machine with two 8 inch floppy diskette drives, a movable keyboard, and a full-page vertically oriented CRT display simulating paper with black characters on a white background, for a  view of text on paper. It was promoted as familiar and easy to use for those experienced with typewriters.  A keyboard with a large set of extra keys made operating the 8000 quite easy even for people without any computer skills or background.  IN, OUT, PRINT, OOPS *OOPS was changed thinking it was insulting to the buyer to assume they would ever make an error.

The CPT 8000 was designed to show a full page of text with a static line showing the margin and tab stops. An additional line would display status or error messages with a times square like display. The times square error and status messages were very well done, "The printer needs a new ribbon" rather than "ERROR 034892". The text page could both smooth pan and scroll by the hardware in the display board and nothing quite like it existed for a very long time. The 8000 ran its own multitasking hardware interrupt driven operating system but it also ran CP/M quite well.  So unlike other companies that sold Wordprocessor only systems, CPT had a system that could run any of the many popular CP/M applications. Using the CP/M OS users could develop Fortran, CBasic, Cobol and other language's programs.

The 8000 used Intel's 8080 microprocessor. The display board was bleeding edge high speed logic. The parts available at this time were pushed to their limits to provide the speed needed to display this much text. There were times that batches of parts from one manufacturer simply could not be clocked as fast as the 8000 display required.  Memory was initially 64K bytes but larger boards of 128K were most common then later 256K were offered.  The 8080 accessed this additional ram by running a custom page flipping circuit. The 8000 was originally priced at $8000 and its daisy wheel printer an additional $8000.  The model number having been confused with the price at its first appearance at the Hanover fair.

An RS-232 serial communication option was available for the 8000 series that allowed the  electronic transfer of documents.  One very popular use of this was to access the Westlaw system.

A tempest approved version of the 8000 was developed that was RF tight with nothing being emitted that could be monitored or spied on.

CPT Phoenix series

The CPT Phoenix was a highly advanced computer system that had a true multiprocessor (featuring the ability for 2 CPUs to access the same memory location with little to no degradation in speed). Note this was not the simpiler dual core system. The memory was error-correcting and not only corrected single bit errors but could identify the part creating the error.  It was the Phoenix and this memory system that discovered early 64K Drams made with ceramic lids were emitting low energy radiation causing a stream of single bit errors. A single chip that showed chronic random location errors had its ceramic lid carefully removed and the errors stopped. A test was devised to determine if the radiation was Alpha, Beta or Gamma radiation.  Placing paper between the lid and the die was tested and then again with a piece of aluminum foil. The Research department's VP Clarence Lehman jokingly suggested Intel be advised it should avoid using pitchblende in its ceramic lids.

The Phoenix had the first custom Graphics Controller with the ability to Bit Blit and hardware pan and scroll. It along with the Multiprocessor was designed with liberal use of PALs (Programmable array logic) along with the standard 74LS TTL parts. CPT developed its own PAL Compiler with a much cleaner syntax and a Hardware Design Language which allowed a complex board such as the graphics controller to be designed without requiring a schematic.  The most important output of the Hardware design language was a parts list and netlist.  "Comments" placed in the source were used as aids to trouble shoot boards.  The placement of the ICs was the only manual step required. The I/O card had a realtime clock, battery backed up 2K of ram, connections for parallel and serial ports and the SASI later known as SCSI bus.  When Seagate delivered its first 5 1/4" 5 Megabyte drives A Xebec SASI to RTL bus board was used to make it function as a SASI drive.  A marketing person suggested valuable time was being wasted on integrating this crazy Shugart storage device.  Documents being roughly 4K he said, "a 5 Megabyte drive would never be filled."

The Phoenix had a separate high speed high resolution portrait monitor with paper white phosphor, which was adjustable in angle. A separate curved keyboard was provided and promoted as ergonomically comfortable but more important employed the concept of "softkeys" that were defined by software and their function displayed on the bottom of the screen. A custom high current switching power supply and the logic circuitry was in a separate box. The Phoenix's three PCBs were double high Multibus II boards.  The original PCBs were wirewrapped, the first deployed PCBs were multiwire. The final PCBs were 8 layer boards fully autorouted by a California company called Shared Resources. Internally there was great doubt anything could reduce down the complexity of the Phoenix graphics controller and Multiprocessor/memory boards to 8 layers and fewer still thought that a true 100% autorouter was possible. The president of Shared Resources, Lee Ritchie, guaranteed his work and said that if there were any errors between supplied netlist and final artwork he would refund the entire cost of the design and pay to make prototypes with the errors fixed.  His autorouter was a Fortran Program that was run on a time shared mainframe that he leased time on. Both the Multiprocessor and the graphics controller were indeed routed perfectly and totally autorouted.  No PCB designers, graphics screens, mice etc were required. The only "Graphics" was the final artwork printed out and gerber film files and NC drill "tape" file.  There was a problem with one trace on the graphics controller which needed to be wider to supply the current needed for the ECL components on the board.  That and that the film layer with TOP silkscreened on it needed to be on Top of the PCB and the layer etched "BOTTOM" had to be on the bottom for the card edge connector to work. This wider trace had not been specified (causing a temporary problem) so the first release of the 8 layer PCB graphics controller needed an ECO wire (Engineer change order) to be able to provide the extra current needed.

Because the Phoenix used the standard Multibus II, third party cards could be plugged into the Phoenix as it had 5 undedicated slots available on its motherboard.  A third party high speed 68000 CPU card was used by the research and development's software department as a way to speed system compiles as the Phoenix was tasked with compiling its own code. It also showed the value of using Stage 2.  The source code for the 8000, Phoenix and other projects was written in MOL (Machine oriented Language, an in house universal assembler language) and MOL source code could be compiled with the same MOL Compiler template files on any machine as long as the Stage 2 program was ported which was a very simple procedure. Stage 2 originally was brought up using an obscure language known as Flub.  A Fortran version of Stage 2 was developed and later there was a version of Stage 2 written in "C". The MSDOS version of Stage 2 was less than 10K bytes so all of the tools CPT used were fast and totally portable to any machine with a running Stage 2. An IBM system 360, IBM PC (MSDOS/WINDOWS), CPT 8000 system, 68000 versions of Stage 2 were written in house and of course Stage 2 was created for many other machines. The PAL compiler and the Hardware Design Language all were templates that ran on any machine with a working Stage 2. Several other third party circuit boards were tested in house such as the Matrox Color display board.

The Phoenix came with a wide selection in operating systems.  CP/M 80, CP/M 86, MP/M, Concurrent as well as the CPT Word Processing software which was fully multitasking. Later the Phoenix was made able to run the then new MSDOS operating system.  The Phoenix was one of the few machines capable of running both native 8080/8085 as well as 8086 code. The 8087 floating point chip was an available option. When it was released (shortly before the IBM PC release) and for a considerable time afterwards it was arguably the most advanced microcomputer system available.

Storage Systems

CPT WordPak

The CPT WordPak series was CPT's first external document storage system that enabled multiple 8000 series workstations to store documents in an electronic filing cabinet.

Prior to WordPak, all documents were stored on removable 8 inch floppy diskettes. Sharing documents involved handing off the original disk, or copying the document to a second disk and 'sneaker-net-ing' (walking it over) to the second 8000. But this resulted in two copies of the document, one at each workstation.

A circuit board with a proprietary cable connector was installed in  the 8000/6000 family of "workstations" and connected to the WordPak by a multi-conductor cable.

WordPak 1 consisted of a single Shugart Associates SA4000 14" diameter hard disc with a capacity of 30 megabytes.

WordPak 2 added a 2nd drive for a total of 60 megabytes.

CPT SRS 45

The CPT SRS 45 was what would now be called a server (quite likely the first of its kind) but in practice was much more. It was maybe the worlds easiest networking shared resource system. It combined a ZIP drive for backup and hard disk(s) that would be shared simultaneously by up to eight CPT machines that had the PC AT bus. The primary person responsible for its development was Bill Davidson whose wife Cheryl was responsible for bringing up CP/M, MP/M and other Digital Research products running on the Phoenix. The brilliance of the system were the networking cards that plugged into the individual machines. These used the 55AA installable driver of the IBM Bios to simply add the zip and hard disk drives to each computers drives list. So a system that started with floppy drives A and B and a C hard disc on the machine would have the SRS 45 drives added as drives D (E, F depending on the number of hard discs) and Z for the zip drive. Sharing (avoiding writing to the same file at the same time) was handled by simply assigning parts of the drives for individuals and other directories for shared use. No "driver" software was needed. You simply plugged in the networking card and your machine had additional drives that were internal to the SRS45. This approach was far ahead of its time and sadly never recognized for its brilliance. The SRS45 as were all CPT machines not just dedicated Word Processors.

Personal-computer based

CPT PT software

CPT PT was a reduced a version of the software that ran under MS-DOS as an application on IBM PC compatible computers. The corporation intended it as a bridge to allow data to flow in and out of personal computer packages, as well as providing a personal-computer word processing application for those familiar with standalone CPT equipment or who preferred the CPT style of dual-window text editing. Price: approx. $200, 1980-era values.

CPT Genius Display
The Genius display was a stand-alone vertically oriented (portrait) configuration monochrome grey-scale CRT monitor unit and an IBM PC form factor display card to allow high resolution full page text & graphics on IBM PC compatible computers. A special MS-DOS driver was required, but allowed a text screen to be 80 characters wide and 66 lines tall (a normal printed page parameters). The display unit looked similar to that of the Phoenix monitor (minus the keyboard) shown in Figure 6 above.

Text editors such as Quicksoft's PC-Write, WordPerfect, WordStar, VolksWriter (and more) supported the full page mode. Lotus Symphony and 1-2-3 would support full page as well as dual screen mode (2 'regular' landscape screens, one in the top half of the screen with the other below.

Windows 3.0 drivers were also developed for this product that allowed for full page screen presentations, just like their dedicated word processors, but with the addition of monochrome graphics.

Some specifications:

9x15 pixel character cell

8x12 pixel character matrix, includes 3 scan line for descenders (i.e. letters g,j,p...)

13th scan line for underscore

progressive scan, 60 Hz vertical refresh rate

64 kHz horizontal scan rate

100 MHz video bandwidth

15" diagonal, 110 degree deflection, paper white, long persistence phosphor

(from at-the-time marketing literature)

The product was originally developed by Micro Display Systems of Hastings Minnesota as the VHR-400. Price: $1500

Hardcopy Printers

Daisy Wheel Printers
Daisy wheel printers from Qume Corporation and Diablo Systems could be connected to the 8000 and 8500 series word processors. These printers could support both fixed pitch and proportional fonts, but could not print graphics/pictures. Price: unknown

Laser Printers
Laser printers were required for printing the documents produced by the Phoenix series word processors as the documents produced could contain embedded graphics. Price: unknown

Nameplates of selected products

References

Word processors
Text editors
Programming tools
Defunct computer companies of the United States
Defunct technology companies of the United States
Computer companies established in 1971
1971 establishments in Minnesota
1990s disestablishments in Minnesota